Saadatabad (also Romanized as Sa‘ādatābād; also known as Sa‘ātābād) is a village in Tarom Rural District, in the Central District of Hajjiabad County, Hormozgan Province, Iran. At the 2006 census, its population was 76, in 20 families.

References 

Populated places in Hajjiabad County